The Garden Cemetery is a cemetery in Hanover, Germany. It was created in 1741 and is located by the  built in 1749. The cemetery and the church are both named after the garden parish outside the former parish city walls in front of Aegidien Gate. The cemetery, which contains a number of classicising grave markers from the first half of the nineteenth century, was closed in 1864 with the establishment of the Stadtfriedhof Engesohde. Today it forms a park in the middle of inner city Hanover. The graves of Charlotte Buff (inspiration of Goethe's "Lotte" in The Sorrows of Young Werther), the astronomer Caroline Herschel and the painter Johann Heinrich Ramberg are located here. The Gartenfriedhof lies on Marienstraße between Warmbüchenstraße and Arnswaldtstraße.

History 

The names  and  date to the establishment of the parish and its cemetery in the Garden community in the eighteenth century. At the time, the modern ward of Südstadt lay outside the city walls and the Aegidien Gate and was used by the "Garden folk" primarily for growing crops and vegetables for sale in the city of Hanover. Because of their simple homes, called Kates, these farmers were also known as "Garden Cossacks" (punningly derived from cotter). In 1741, the City of Hanover established the "New Churchyard before the Aegidien Gate" for these people. This was replaced by a new building constructed from 1887 to 1891 by the architect Rudolph Eberhard Hillebrand. In their artistic devotion to classicising elements, these grave monuments represent the ethos of the bourgeois classknown in Hannöversch as the "Hübsche families. There are also works of art, like the gravestone with acanthus flowers and palmettes designed by Georg Ludwig Friedrich Laves for Charlotte Buff or the four sphinxes pulling Kielmannsegge's stone sarcophagus.

Already in the nineteenth century, the Open Grave, subject of numerous horror stories, had developed into an early tourist attraction and a Hanover landmark.

Since the 1950s, the  has fallen into serious decay, especially the sandstone gravestones and wrought iron fences. Since the old fence was melted down during the Second World War, the former railing of the  bridge in the Hanoverian suburb of Vinnhorst was recycled as a fence for the cemetery in 1984. Community efforts by various cultural societies finally led to the protection and refurbishment of the space. As a result, a bronze plaque with a map was installed in the entrance area in the mid-1990s by the Hannover-Leineschloß Rotary club, which makes it possible to find the way to the most distinguished surviving tombs. The numbers on this table are the same as those in literature issued by the Parks and Gardens Office.

Renaissance Gartenfriedhof

The society 

In 2011 the group "Renaissance Gartenfriedhof" was founded under the umbrella of the Heimatbund Niedersachsen, from which the charitable organisation "Renaissance Gartenfriedhof e.V." was formed in September 2011. Their goals are:
 Improvement of the historic space,
 Conservation and restoration of the grave monuments,
 Negotiation of sponsorship for individual grave plots,
 Cultural use of the Gartenfriedhof for commemoration of the deceased, staged readings, concerts, and dramatic performances,
 Exhibition and presentation of the treasures of the Gartenfriedhof and establishment as a tourist destination.

Current sponsorship 
The sponsorship of the gravestone of the royal court painter Johann Heinrich Ramberg was taken up by his great-great-great-grandson Jürgen Behrens. The inauguration of the sponsorship occurred on 14 April 2012 in the Gartenfriedhof. Speakers included the historian Alheidis von Rohr, retired Superintendent Dieter Zinßer who is the chairman of Renaissance Gartenfriedhof e.V., and mayor Bernd Strauch. The occasion was celebrated musically with songs from Ramberg's time by Ja-Henrik Behnken (tenor).

Further sponsors were celebrated in the Gartenfriedhof at the beginning of their sponsorships on 10 December 2011. Speakers included Dieter Zinßer and mayor Hans Mönninghoff. It concerned the graves of the following:
 Heinrich Andreas Jakob Lutz ("Menschenfressergrab") – Susanne Debus
 Hansing – Daniel Gardemin
 Johann Christoph Salfeld – Loccum Abbey
 Heinrich Tramm – Henriettenstiftung

The sponsorship of the gravestone of Charlotte Henriette Caroline Kestner nee Buff was undertaken by the charity "Ahlers pro Arte". This was celebrated on 24 September 2011, with speakers including Christel Thomczyk who is a fourth generation descendant of Charlotte Kestner, Jan Ahlers on behalf of the society, Dieter Zinßer, Ingeborg Rupprecht and  Lord Mayor Stephan Weil. The celebration was enlivened by a brass band performance and short readings from Goethe's Dichtung und Wahrheit by Moritz Nikolaus Koch of Theater für Niedersachsen.

Grave monuments (selection)

On the official table 
The numbers match the bronze plaque at the entrance.

 Ernst August Rumann (1745–1827), Privy Councillor, Minister of Justice.
 Rudolph Wilhelm Rumann (1784–1857), Town clerk
 Christian Philipp Iffland (1750–1835), Mayor
 Johann Philipp Conrad Falcke (1724–1805), Chancellery Director, and Ernst Friedrich Hector Falcke (1751–1809), Judicial councillor and Mayor
 August Ulrich von Hardenberg (1709–1778), Hanoverian diplomat, Privy councillor and Military councillor
 Georg Friedrich Grotefend (1775–1853), Schoolmaster, decipherer of cuneiform
 Ludewig Johann Georg Mejer (1737–1802), Councillor
 Ludwig Friedrich von Beulwitz (1726–1796) and Magdalene Sophie Friederique von Beulwitz, ne von Kipe (1740–1801)
 Claus von der Decken (1742–1826), Minister, and Sophie von der Decken, ne von Hanstein (1757–1798)
 Johann Benjamin Koppe (1750–1791), Court chaplain
 "Menschenfresser-Grab“ of Heinrich Richard Andreas Jakob Lutz (1728–1794), Royal Master Carpenter
 Johann Christoph Salfeld (1750–1829), Priest
 Heinrich Philipp Sextro (1746–1838), Professor and abbot
 Carl Klop (1805–1840), Pastor at the Gartenkirche
 Carl Rudolph August von Kielmannsegge (1731–1810), Minister and President of the Chamber
 Ida Arenhold (1798–1863), first head of the Friederikenstift
 Johann Daniel Ramberg (1733–1820), Councillor
 Johann Heinrich Ramberg (1763–1840), Painter
 Christian Heinrich Tramm (1819–1861), Architect
 Heinrich Bernhard Röhrs (1776–1835), Businessman and Senator (Finance)
 Caroline Herschel (1750–1848), Astronomer
 Johann Anton Lammersdorff (1758–1822), Doctor and founder of Naturhistorischen Gesellschaft Hannover
 Friedrich Wilhelm Christian von Dachenhausen (1791–1855), Founder of the trade association
 Christian Ludwig Albrecht Patje (1748–1817), Official and Publicist
 Ludwig Albrecht Friedrich Wilhelm Gottfried von Werlhof (1818–1836)
 Ernst August von Werlhof (1778–1857), Privy Councillor
 Friedrich Krancke (1782–1852), Maths teacher
 Georg Wilding Prince of Butera Radali (1790–1841)
 Charlotte Kestner (1753–1828)
 Georg Ludwig Compert (1797–1859), State builder
 Christian Ludwig August von Arnswaldt (1733–1815), Minister
 Henriette Juliane Caroline von Rüling (1756–1782), whose Open Grave was a civic landmark
 Georg Charlotte von Hinüber (1764–1828), Postmaster general, Cabinet minister and Privy Councillor, Major, Diplomat, Auditor of the Chancellery and art historian
 Ludwig Eberhard Reichsfreiherr von Gemmingen-Hornberg (1719–1782), Minister
 Georg Wilhelm Ebell (1696–1770), Abbot of Loccum, Founder of the Civic fire department (plaque on the inner south wall of the Gartenkirche)
 Ernst Anton Heiliger (1729–1803), Councillor and mayor of the Old City.

Additional graves 

 Ernst Ludwig Taentzel (also Täntzel, Tänzel, Taenzel) (1791–1845), Mason and Court stonemaster
 Johann Georg Taentzel (also Tänzel, Taenzel, Täntzel) (1755–1815), Court and council master mason-architect and stonemason.
 Shared tomb of
 Georg Friedrich Mühry (1774–1848), important doctor of the first half of the nineteenth century, Upper medical council, Court Doctor, scholarly author (birth date on the tomb is incorrect!)
Carl Mühry (1806–1840), Court doctor and author
 Johann Georg Spangenberg (1788–1849), royal personal doctor

See also 
 List of cemeteries

Bibliography 
 Conrad von Meding, HAZ-Interview / Mehr Respekt für Gartenfriedhof gefordert  in Hannoversche Allgemeine Zeitung, 19 October 2012, last accessed 23. November 2012.
 Ludwig Damm, "Von alten Friedhöfen der Stadt Hannover", edited by Magistrat, Hannover 1914.
 Alfred Fuhrmann, "Der Gartenfriedhof in Hannover in geschichtlicher und kunstgeschichtlicher Bedeutung." Hannoverscher Volks-Kalender. vol. 62 (1931), pp. 45–51.
 Arnold Nöldeke, "Die Kunstdenkmäler der Provinz Hannover". 1: Regierungsbezirk Hannover. Heft 2: Stadt Hannover. Teil 1: Denkmäler des "alten" Stadtgebietes Hannover. Hannover 1932, pp. 192–200.
 Hinrich Hesse, "Die Grabinschriften des Gartenkirchhofs in Hannover." Zeitschrift der Gesellschaft für niedersächsische Kirchengeschichte. vol. 44 (1939), pp.  235–290.
 Hans Geiß, "Der Gartenfriedhof", in: Heimatland, 1983, pp. 1–3.
 Gerhard Richter, "Der Gartenfriedhof in Hannover", in Hannoversche Geschichtsblätter, New Series, vol. 38 (1984), pp. 53–76, 
 Ludwig Wülker, "Die Hannoverschen Friedhöfe im Wandel der Geschichte". Hannoversche Geschichtsblätter, New Series 5 (1939), pp. 76–81.
 Waldemar R. Röhrbein, "Von Hannovers alten Friedhöfen." In Geschichten um Hannovers Kirchen. Studien, Bilder, Dokumente, edited by Hans Werner Dannowski und Waldemar R. Röhrbein, Hannover: Lutherhaus-Verlag 1983, pp. 97–102 (auch über den Gartenfriedhof), .
 Gerd Weiß, Marianne Zehnpfennig, "Gartenkirche und Gartenfriedhof," in Denkmaltopographie Bundesrepublik Deutschland, Baudenkmale in Niedersachsen, Stadt Hannover, Teil 1, [Bd.] 10.1, pp. 65f.
 Helmut Knocke, Hugo Thielen, Hannover. Kunst- und Kultur-Lexikon. Handbuch und Stadtführer. 3., rev. Aufl. Schäfer, Hannover 1995, p. 149.
 Inge Pusch et al. (Text): Der Gartenfriedhof, free Brochure of the Landeshauptstadt Hannover
 or as .PDF online
 Peter Schulze: "Gartenfriedhof" in Stadtlexikon Hannover, pp. 202.

Notes 

Cemeteries in Germany
Buildings and structures in Hanover
Tourist attractions in Hanover
Geography of Hanover